Vanvoorstia bennettiana (Bennett's seaweed) was an extinct red algae from Australia. It is named after naturalist George Bennett.

Biology
Vanvoorstia bennetiana was a small red algae. Like other members of its genus, V. bennettiana did not have significant differences in morphology throughout any phase of its life cycle. It can be distinguished from other members of its genus by its small size and by the structure of its reproductive organs. The overall structure of the algae is that of a blade with fine meshing. For much of the time it was extant, the algae was common.

The algae has only been found in two localities; both in or near Sydney Harbour. One was near the eastern part of Spectacle Island, where it was discovered between May 1 and May 15, 1855. The other was in a channel between Point Piper and Shark Island, where numerous specimens were collected in 1886.

Extinction
Since the V. bennettiana discovery, Sydney Harbour has been massively altered by human activities. These activities substantially increased the siltation level in Sydney Harbour. Fine-meshed algae species are especially vulnerable to this type of disturbance because the particulate matter can often clog the blade and prevent light necessary for photosynthesis from reaching the organism.

A search by Arthur Lucas in 1916 failed to find the species. Since it had been only found in two places, V. bennettiana became extinct by then. The causes were human disturbance, habitat destruction, and pollution. Searches along the entire coastline of New South Wales failed to locate the species.

Vanvoorstia bennettiana was, until an update in 2007, the only protist anywhere on the IUCN's Red List.

References

External links
 Page at the Extinction Website including a picture

Delesseriaceae
Algae of Australia
Extinct biota of Australia